Haykel Al-Achouri (also Haykel Achouri, ; born August 29, 1984 in Tunis) is an amateur Tunisian Greco-Roman wrestler, who played for the men's light heavyweight category. He is a multiple-time African wrestling champion, and a bronze medalist for his division at the 2011 Pan Arab Games in Doha, Qatar.

Achouri represented Tunisia at the 2008 Summer Olympics in Beijing, where he competed for the men's 84 kg class. He received a bye for the preliminary round of sixteen match, before losing out to Azerbaijan's Shalva Gadabadze, who was able to score five points each in two straight periods, leaving Achouri without a single point.

At the 2012 Summer Olympics in London, Achouri, however, lost again in the second preliminary match of men's 84 kg class to Ukraine's Vasyl Rachyba, with a technical score of 0–3.

He competed at the 2020 Summer Olympics. He competed in the men's 97 kg event.

References

External links
 
 
 
 

1984 births
Living people
Olympic wrestlers of Tunisia
Wrestlers at the 2008 Summer Olympics
Wrestlers at the 2012 Summer Olympics
Wrestlers at the 2020 Summer Olympics
Sportspeople from Tunis
Tunisian male sport wrestlers
Mediterranean Games bronze medalists for Tunisia
Mediterranean Games medalists in wrestling
Competitors at the 2013 Mediterranean Games